is a Japanese island in the Seto Inland Sea, located near the coast of Okayama Prefecture. It is part of Higashi-ku, Okayama.

, Inujima has a population of 47.

Access from mainland
A ferry service operates between Hōden and Inujima.

Industrial heritage
A copper refinery was opened on the island in 1909, but this closed in 1919. The brick-built refinery remained largely undemolished, and from 2008, it formed the centrepiece of a large-scale art project designed to stimulate tourism to the island.

Inujima Art Project

The  is a rehabilitation project covering the entire island by the Naoshima Fukutake Art Museum Foundation, a project of Benesse Corporation. It opened to the public in April 2008. The first phase of the project was to turn the old seirensho refinery into a model of contemporary architecture and art to recycle the Japanese industrial heritage. It was the coordinated efforts of the architect Hiroshi Sambuichi and Yukinori Yanagi who collaborated with the architect in his artwork, and the Faculty of Environmental Science and Technology at Okayama University.

Population data
The population of the island has changed over the years as follows.

Film locations
 Seibu Keisatsu (July 1984)

References

External links

 Benesse Art Site Naoshima
 Inujima Island (Okayama Prefectural International Tourism Association)

Islands of Okayama Prefecture
Benesse
Contemporary art galleries in Japan
Modernist architecture in Japan
Art museums established in 2008